Primula frigida, synonym Dodecatheon frigidum, commonly called the western arctic shootingstar, is a plant species found in arctic and subarctic regions in the northwestern part of North America and in Asiatic Russia.

Description
Primula frigida is an herbaceous perennial up to 40 cm (16 inches) tall, spreading by means of underground rhizomes. Each shoot produces 2-7 flowers, usually pink to magenta with a white center.

Distribution
It is common across much of Alaska, and has also been reported from Yukon, Northwest Territories, British Columbia, northern Saskatchewan, and on the Chukotsk Peninsula in the Russian Far East (often erroneously regarded as part of Siberia). It is usually found in moist areas such as bogs, lakeshores, riverbanks, moist meadows, and heathcliff tundras. It can found on melting snow on or near permafrost.

References

frigida
Flora of Alaska
Flora of Yukon
Flora of the Northwest Territories
Flora of British Columbia
Flora of the Russian Far East
Flora of Saskatchewan
Taxa named by Adelbert von Chamisso
Flora without expected TNC conservation status